The Thailand Classic is a professional golf tournament currently played on the European Tour. The tournament was created in 2015, as a co-sanctioned event between the Asian Tour and the European Tour.

History
The inaugural tournament was played from 12–15 February 2015 at the Black Mountain Golf Club, in Hua Hin. The tournament was renamed as the True Thailand Classic after the True Corporation had committed to sponsoring the event.

Australian Andrew Dodt won the inaugural tournament by one stroke over Scott Hend and Thongchai Jaidee. Hend won the following year.

Having not been played since 2016, the tournament was revived in 2023, solely as part of the European Tour schedule. It was played at Amata Spring Country Club.

Winners

See also
Black Mountain Masters, Asian Tour event at Black Mountain GC, 2009–10
2011 Royal Trophy, also played at Black Mountain GC

Notes

References

External links
Coverage on the European Tour's official site
Coverage on the Asian Tour's official site
Black Mountain Golf Club official site

European Tour events
Former Asian Tour events
Golf tournaments in Thailand
Recurring sporting events established in 2015
Recurring sporting events disestablished in 2016
2015 establishments in Thailand